Jamil bin Osman (born 3 May 1950) is a Malaysian scholar, professor of Islamic Economics, pioneer of Islamic banking and finance in Malaysia, Rector and CEO of Insaniah University College. Prior to working at Insaniah, he served as Dean of Admissions and Records Division (1989-1999) and Deputy Rector Academic Affairs (1999-2003) at International Islamic University Malaysia. He were awarded the honorific title of Dato' three times (Dato, Dato Paduka and Dato Wira).

Biography 
He was born in 1950 in Kepala Batas, Kedah. Young Jamil received his early education at Sekolah Kebangsaan Kepala Batas, and Sekolah Kebangsaan Padang Garong, Kota Baharu, Kelantan. In 1962 he was named as the overall best student in the state of Kelantan. In 1969 he joined Institut Teknologi Mara (ITM) where he pursued a four-year program in statistics. In 1985 he received a diploma in Islamic studies from Universiti Kebangsaan Malaysia. 

Osman obtained his PhD in Economics and Finance from Rensselaer Polytechnic Institute (RPI), New York (1988), MSc in Econometrics from Western Michigan University, Kalamazoo (1981) and Undergraduate degree in Statistics from Central London Polytechnic (now University of Westminster) and was a lecturer in a University of Nottingham. He is married to Datin Zuraidah Binti Ahmad Murad and has four children.

Career 

 Research Officer of MARDI, Serdang, Malaysia
 Lecturer, Institute Technology of MARA, Malaysia
 Founding member of KENMS, IIUM
 Deputy Dean of Economic Kulliyyah, IIUM
 Head of Economics Department, IIUM
 Dean of Admissions and Records, IIUM
 Deputy Rector (Academics), International Islamic University, Malaysia (IIUM)
 Representative of East and South East Asia (Director), IIIT
 Honorary Senior Fellow, IIUM
 Technical Adviser, Universal Crescent standard center (UCSC)
 President of Malaysian Institute of Statistics

Awards 
The title of Darjah Kebesaran Gemilang Seri Mahkota Kedah Yang Dihormati (DGMK) conferred by His Majesty Sultan of Kedah Darul Aman in 2011.
Professor Emeritus from International Islamic University Malaysia in 2016.
International Gold Medal Award Islamic Countries Society of Statistical Sciences in Doha, Qatar (2012)

References

External links 
 Prof. Dato' Wira Dr. Jamil bin Osman
 Insaniah University College
 2nd International Conference on Islam and Higher Education
 International conference on Islamic Banking (ICIB)
 The Inception of Young Imam/Muslimah Course
 International conference on 'Islamic Business, Finance'

Living people
Sunni Islam
1950 births
National University of Malaysia alumni
Academic staff of the International Islamic University Malaysia
Malaysian economists
Alumni of the University of Nottingham
Rensselaer Polytechnic Institute alumni
Western Michigan University alumni